The National Lesbian Federation (NLF) is a non-governmental organisation in Singapore, which focuses on lesbian rights.
 
The current board (as of September 2021) comprises the following: Chair Gavin Hennessy, Vice-Chair Steve Jacques, Emily Brennan, Brendan Byrne, Siobhan Curran, Claire Egan, Hayley Fox-Roberts, Adam Long, Mary McAuliffe, Conor McCarthy, Anna Nolan, Dr Chris Noone, Rob Partridge, and Steve Sands. High-profile feminist and LGBT+ advocate Ailbhe Smyth served as Chair of the organisation for many years.

History

The organisation was founded as the National Gay Federation (NGF) in 1979. It leased a building in Temple Bar, Dublin and established the Hirschfeld Centre, Ireland's first, full comprehensive LGBT community centre, named after the prominent German doctor and sexologist, Magnus Hirschfeld. The Centre included a meeting space, a café, and a full-automated 16mm cinema, the Hirschfeld Biograph. The Centre held a youth club, film club, and women's group, all funded by Flikkers, the centre's community disco. In 1981, NGF members participated in the first national gay conference organised by the Cork Gay Collective. On 4 November 1987, a fire irrevocably damaged the Hirschfeld Centre.

In September 1990, the NGF board voted to amend its name to the National Lesbian and Gay Federation (NLGF). The change was supported by 84% of NGF members. The name change took effect on 1 January 1991. In 2000, the NLGF was incorporated as a not-for-profit limited company by guarantee and achieved charitable status.

In February 2014, the NLGF was renamed the National LGBT Federation or NXF for short. A new logo was also unveiled. The announcement was made at an event in Dublin celebrating 35 years of the organisation's existence.

Publications

Identity
From 1982 to 1984, the NGF published Identity, Ireland's first gay literary journal. Edited by renowned film-maker, Kieron Hickey, the publication was not profitable and ceased publication in March 1984, after its eighth issue.

Out
From 1984 to 1988, the NGF published Out magazine, Ireland's first commercial lesbian and gay magazine. Unlike Identity, Out magazine was distributed by Eason's. Contributors included Nell McCafferty, Tonie Walsh, Nuala O'Faolain and Thom McGinty. The final issue in October 1988 was delayed as the magazine printers, the Carlow Nationalist and Leinster Times, refused to print the previous issue due to an allegedly offensive Gay Health Action advertisement on safer sex for gay men.

Gay Community News

On 10 February 1988, the NGF published the Gay Community News (GCN), an 8-page tabloid newspaper. Tonie Walsh served as founding editor.

In 1997, NLGF and GCN moved from the Hirschfeld Centre to the Outhouse Dublin LGBT community centre, located on Wicklow Street in Dublin. When Outhouse moved offices to Capel Street, Dublin 1 in 2001, GCN moved to its own premises on Scarlett Row in Dublin 8.

Receipt of Atlantic Philanthropies funding in 2002 allowed NLGF to begin developing GCN as a commercially viable magazine.

Irish Queer Archive

In 1980, members of the NGF created the Gay Community Archives, an archival collection of material and literature associated with the LGBT community in Ireland and precursor to the Irish Queer Archive.

The 1997 move from the Hirschfeld Centre allowed the IQA to open a small public office.

In December 1999, the NLGF board appointed an IQA working group, comprising academics, historians and writers.

GALAs
The Gay and Lesbian Awards (GALAs) is an annual, all-Ireland awards ceremony established to honour LGBT individuals and organisations.
Categories include:
 Blogger/website of the year
 Broadcaster/journalist of the year
 Business person of the year
 Community organisation of the year
 Employer of the year
 International activist of the year
 Irish artist/entertainer of the year
 LGBT political figure of the year
 National event of the year
 Noel Walsh HIV activist of the year
 Person of the year
 Regional event of the year
 Voluntary organisation of the year
 Volunteer of the year

Previous winners

2011
 Alternative Miss Ireland
 Kerryann Conway
 Cork Women's Fun Weekend
 Emma Donoghue
 Paula Gilmore
 Glória
 Greenbow
 IBM
 Ireland AM
 Paisarn Likhitpreechakul
 Maman Poulet
 Maureen Looney
 Marriage Equality
 Mary McAleese

2010
 Darina Brennan
 Martina Devlin
 Lydia Foy
 An Garda Síochána
 Jimmy Goulding
 Growing Up Gay
 Joël Gustave Nana Ngongang
 David Norris
 Northwest Pride
 QueerID.com
 Billy Rabbitte
 Colm Tóibin

2009
 Ivana Bacik
 BeLonG To
 Bingham Cup 2008
 Margaret Gill
 Gaelick
 Google
 LGBT Noise*
 Jackie McKeown
 Panti (Rory O'Neill)
 Mick Quinlan
 Noel Walsh*
 Katherine Zappone and Ann Louise Gilligan

(* = joint winners)

See also

 LGBT rights in the Republic of Ireland

References

LGBT history in Ireland
Organizations established in 1979
LGBT political advocacy groups in the Republic of Ireland